School's Out is a 1930 Our Gang short comedy film directed by Robert F. McGowan. Produced by Hal Roach and released to theaters by Metro-Goldwyn-Mayer, it was the 102nd Our Gang short to be released.

Plot
Jackie is trying to circulate a petition among his classmates to keep school open during the summer, as he and the gang are afraid that they might lose Miss Crabtree during summer vacation. In addition, the kids fear that she might get married and therefore no longer be able to teach them.

The gang has grown to like Miss Crabtree tremendously, and ride with her in her roadster to school every morning. In the car this particular morning, the kids all try to scare Miss Crabtree away from even considering marriage in the future, but Miss Crabtree states that she wants to get married some day.

Later in the day, Miss Crabtree goes into town for lunch and a man named "Jack" stops by the school looking for her. The man is actually Miss Crabtree's brother, but the gang is afraid that Jack is a suitor who wants to marry their teacher. The kids tell the man outlandish lies about Miss Crabtree in order to scare him away ("She has two false sets of teeth and one wooden leg!" "She's got seven husbands!" "And twenty-one kids!"). Jackie, Farina, and Chubby follow Jack when he leaves the schoolyard and goes for a swim in the nearby lake. Hoping to keep Jack away from Miss Crabtree, the boys steal and stash his clothes, forcing Jack to wander around dressed in leaves and branches.

Cast

The Gang
 Jackie Cooper as Jackie Cooper
 Norman Chaney as Chubby Chaney
 Matthew Beard as Hercules
 Dorothy DeBorba as Echo
 Allen Hoskins as Farina
 Bobby Hutchins as Wheezer
 Mary Ann Jackson as Mary Ann Jackson
 Donald Haines as Donald Haines
 Buddy McDonald as Buddy O'Donnell
 Bobby Young as Robert 'Bonedust'
 Pete the Pup as himself

Additional cast
 Douglas Greer as Douglas Greer 
 Bobby Mallon as Bobby Mallon 
 June Marlowe as Miss Crabtree
 Creighton Hale as Jack Crabtree
 Lyle Tayo as Woman on path
 Mildred Kornman as Classroom extra
 Barbara Roach as Classroom extra
 Beverly and Betty Mae Crane as the title readers
 William Courtwright as the old man (scene deleted)

Production notes
A sequel to Teacher's Pet, School's Out was the second of six Our Gang shorts to feature June Marlowe as Miss Crabtree. This was also Bobby Young's first talkie short in Our Gang. When shown on television as part of King World's Little Rascals package from the 1970s on, School's Out was edited to remove racial humor and stereotypes relating to African-Americans.

The kids lost their last teacher, Miss Magillicuddy, after she got married. In the 1930s, female teachers were usually not allowed to continue their profession after marriage.

School's Out is one of four sound Our Gang shorts that fell into the public domain after the copyright lapsed in the 1960s (the other three being Bear Shooters, Our Gang Follies of 1938 and Waldo's Last Stand). As such, these films frequently appear on inexpensive video and/or DVD compilations.

See also
 Our Gang filmography

References

External links

1930 films
American black-and-white films
1930 comedy films
Films directed by Robert F. McGowan
Hal Roach Studios short films
Our Gang films
Films with screenplays by H. M. Walker
1930s American films